The discography of Robert Wyatt, a retired English musician, consists of eight solo studio albums, six archival/collaborations albums, ten compilation albums, two boxed sets, nine EPs and 15 singles. He has also appeared as a guest musician on a large number of albums by other artists.

Between 1966 and 1971 Wyatt was drummer and vocalist for the Canterbury scene band Soft Machine and played on the first four of the band's albums: The Soft Machine (1968), Volume Two (1969), Third (1970) and Fourth (1971).

Albums

Studio albums

Archival albums

Remix albums

Collaborative albums

Compilation albums

Box sets

EPs

Singles

Tributes

Appearances

 Backing vocals on The Animals' Love Is (1968)
 Drums on most of Kevin Ayers Joy of a Toy (1969)
 Drums on two tracks of Syd Barrett The Madcap Laughs (1970)
 Harmony vocals on "Whatevershebringswesing" on Kevin Ayers's Whatevershebringswesing (1971)
 Drums and vocals on Daevid Allen Banana Moon (1971)
 Drums on The Keith Tippett Group Dedicated To You, But You Weren't Listening (1971)
 Drums on Keith Tippett's Centipede Septober Energy (1971)
 Drums on Don "Sugarcane" Harris Sugar Cane's Got the Blues (1971)
 Harmony vocals on "Hymn" on Kevin Ayers Bananamour (1973)
 Percussion on Kevin Ayers June 1, 1974 (1974)
 Percussion and backing vocals on Brian Eno Taking Tiger Mountain (By Strategy) (1974)
 2nd lead vocals on "Calyx" on Hatfield and the North Hatfield and the North (1975)
 Vocals and percussion on Phil Manzanera Diamond Head (1975)
 Vocals on Michael Mantler The Hapless Child (1975/76) 
 Vocals on John Cage "Experiences No. 2" and The Wonderful Widow Of Eighteen Springs on Jan Steele/John Cage's Voices and Instruments (1976)
 Vocals on Michael Mantler Silence (1976)
 Vocals on "Bad Alchemy" and "Little Red Riding Hood Hits the Road" on Henry Cow Concerts (1976)
 Piano on "1/1" on Brian Eno Ambient 1: Music for Airports (1978)
 Recorded a one-minute piano/vocal version of "Strangers In The Night" for the compilation album Miniatures - a sequence of fifty-one tiny masterpieces produced by Morgan Fisher (1980)
 Drums on Kevin Coyne Sanity Stomp (1980)
 Vocals on Nick Mason Fictitious Sports (1981)
 Drums on one track of The Raincoats Odyshape album (1981)
 Keyboards on Scritti Politti Songs to Remember (1982)
 Wyatt released Summer Into Winter in collaboration with Ben Watt (1982), an EP of extra tracks for Watt's 1987 album North Marine Drive
 Vocals on two tracks on The Last Nightingale (1984)
 Vocals on four tracks on News from Babel Letters Home (1986)
 Vocals on three tracks on Michael Mantler Many Have No Speech (1987)
 Vocals on Ultramarine United Kingdoms (1993)
 Vocals on one track on Michael Mantler The School of Understanding (1996)
 Vocals on three tracks on John Greaves Songs (1996)
 Vocals, trumpet, vocal percussions, whistle and backing vocals on one song on Cristina Donà Nido (1999)
 Vocals on Michael Mantler Hide and Seek (2000)
 Vocals on Pascal Comelade September Song EP (2000)
 Vocals on one track on Anja Garbarek Smiling & Waving (2001)
 Vocals on two tracks on Bruno Coulais motion picture soundtrack Travelling Birds (2001)
 Cover version of "Love" on Uncut Presents: Instant Karma 2002; a Tribute to John Lennon (2002)
 Vocals on "Submarine" on Björk's Medúlla (2004)
 Spoken word and trumpet on "Re-arranging the 20th Century" on Gilad Atzmon's Musik (2004)
 Vocals on six tracks on Michael Mantler Review (compilation – 2006)
 Readings on some tracks on Max Richter Songs from Before (2006)
 Cornet on the song "Then I Close My Eyes" on David Gilmour On an Island (2006)
 Vocals on the song "Flies" with Brian Eno on Plague Songs (compilation – 2006)
 Guest cornet on Clear Frame (Lol Coxhill, Charles Hayward, Hugh Hopper, Orphy Robinson) (2007) 
 Cornet on the song "Then I Close My Eyes" on David Gilmour Remember That Night (2007)
 Wyattron on "Cold Shoulder" on Kevin Ayers The Unfairground (2007)
 Vocals on "This Summer Night" on Bertrand Burgalat Chéri B.B (2007) – released in 2008 as a limited edition 12" vinyl single (500 copies only)
 Vocals and shared song-writing credits on two tracks for Monica Vasconcelos' album Hih (2008)
 Backing vocals on "I Keep Faith" on Billy Bragg Mr Love & Justice (2008)
 Hand Drums on two songs on Everything That Happens Will Happen Today by David Byrne and Brian Eno (2008)
 "Camouflage" in collaboration with Barbara Morgenstern on her album BM (2008)
 Trumpet and piano on "A Song for Alice" on Paul Weller 22 Dreams album (2008)
 Vocals on Hot Chip (featuring Geese) EP (not the LP of the same name) Made in the Dark (2009)
 Vocals (partly lead, partly backing) and trumpet on some tracks on Jeanette Lindström Attitude and Orbit Control (2009)
 Vocals on "Sad Eyes" on Dave Sinclair album Stream (2011)
 Lead vocals and horn on "When U Love Somebody" and backing vocals on "No Water" on Ian James Stewart's album Junk DNA (2013).
 Vocals, cornet and horn on "Stella Maris" by Robert Wyatt and Boris Grebenshchikov (2015)
 Cornet on the song "The Girl in the Yellow Dress" on David Gilmour Rattle That Lock (2015)
 Vocals, Tenor Horn on the song "Ibrahim" on The Great Divide's Ibrahim EP (2016)
 Trumpet on the song "She Moves With The Fayre" on Paul Weller A Kind Revolution (2017)
 Vocals & Source Sounds on "What Light There Is Tells Us Nothing" on Janek Schaefer What Light There Is Tells Us Nothing LP (2018)
 Vocals on three tracks on Mary Halvorson's Code Girl Artlessly Falling (2020)

References

Discographies of British artists
Folk music discographies
Rock music discographies